Masatoshi Okada (岡田 雅利, born June 30, 1989 in Nara, Nara) is a Japanese professional baseball catcher for the Saitama Seibu Lions in Japan's Nippon Professional Baseball.

External links

NPB.com

1989 births
Living people
Baseball people from Nara Prefecture
Japanese baseball players
Nippon Professional Baseball catchers
Saitama Seibu Lions players